No Answer: Lower Floors is a studio album by American noise trio Wolf Eyes. It was released in April 2013 under De Stijl Records.

Track list

References

2013 albums
Wolf Eyes albums